Actinopyga agassizii, commonly known as five-toothed sea cucumber or West Indian sea cucumber, is a species of sea cucumber in the family Holothuriidae. It was first described by German zoologist Emil Selenka in 1867. It is native to the Western Atlantic region, including the Gulf of Mexico and the Caribbean Sea, and is harvested for food.

Description
It has a white ground color with scattered yellow-brown spots. Its skin is thick and leathery, and its upper side is lined with papillae (conical fleshy protuberances) while rows of tube feet are found on its bottom side. It has five calcareous teeth surrounding its anus, a characteristic from which one of its common names is derived.

Distribution and habitat
Actinopyga agassizii is found in the tropical Western Atlantic region, its range extending from the Gulf of Mexico to the Caribbean Sea. It is also found off the coasts of Bermuda.

Biology
Actinopyga agassizii feeds on detritus on algal turfs and sea grass beds and in sandy or rocky areas. An individual possesses only one of the two sexes and has a single gonad. It spawns and fertilizes both externally and may show signs of brooding. Its life cycle consists of the embryo growing into a free-swimming larva before developing a barrel-shaped body and later undergoing metamorphosis to turn into a juvenile sea cucumber. As a mode of self-defence, it can expel clusters of sticky threads called Cuvierian tubules which contain a toxic saponin named holothurin that can paralyze other animals.

Status
Actinopyga agassizii is caught for food in small-scale fisheries. However, the quantities and the locations in which it is fished are currently unknown. It is less popular among fisheries compared with other sea cucumber species, although its popularity may rise when other species with higher demands are exhausted in numbers. Its conservation status is listed by the IUCN as being of "least concern".

See also

References

External links 
 
 

Holothuriidae
Fauna of the Atlantic Ocean
Animals described in 1867
Taxobox binomials not recognized by IUCN